The Overwhelmingly Large Telescope (OWL) was a conceptual design by the European Southern Observatory (ESO) organization for an extremely large telescope, which was intended to have a single aperture of 100 meters in diameter. Because of the complexity and cost of building a telescope of this unprecedented size, ESO has elected to focus on the 39-meter diameter Extremely Large Telescope instead.

History
OWL was first proposed in 1998, and at that time was estimated to be technologically feasible by 2010–2015.

While the original 100 m design would not exceed the angular resolving power of interferometric telescopes, it would have exceptional light-gathering and imaging capacity that would greatly increase the depth to which mankind could explore the universe. The OWL could be expected to regularly see astronomical objects with an apparent magnitude of 38, or 1,500 times fainter than the faintest object that has been detected by the Hubble Space Telescope.

All proposed designs for the OWL are variations on a segmented mirror, since there is no technology available to build and transport a monolithic 60- or 100-meter mirror. The operation of a segmented mirror is somewhat more complicated than a monolithic one, requiring careful alignment of the segments (a technique called cophasing). Experience gained in existing segmented mirrors (for example, the Keck telescope) suggests that the mirror proposed for the OWL is feasible. However, the projected cost (of around €1.5 billion) was considered too high, so the ESO is now building the smaller Extremely Large Telescope around 39 m in diameter. Also, there appears to be some inconsistency as to the actual construction costs of the OWL, with some estimating its cost an order of magnitude higher (ELT currently at €1.3 billion, equivalent to around $1.3 billion, scaled using D^2.77 proportionality assuming a 100 meter diameter yields $21 billion).

It has been estimated that a telescope with a diameter of 80 meters would be able to spectroscopically analyse Earth-size planets around the forty nearest sun-like stars. As such, this telescope could help in the exploration of exoplanets and extraterrestrial life (because the spectrum from the planets could reveal the presence of molecules indicative of life).

See also
Active optics
Adaptive optics
Extremely Large Telescope
Giant Magellan Telescope
List of optical telescopes
List of largest optical reflecting telescopes
Thirty Meter Telescope

References

External links 

The ESO 100-m optical telescope concept
OWL BLUE BOOK – Phase A design report
ESO - ELT
The Future of Filled Aperture Telescopes: Is a 100 m feasible?

European Southern Observatory
Optical telescopes
Astronomical observatories in Chile
Unbuilt buildings and structures